The Afghanistan national cricket team toured the United Arab Emirates (UAE) from 5 to 12 October 2011. The tour consisted of one ICC Intercontinental Cup match and a pair of ICC Intercontinental Cup One-Day matches against the United Arab Emirates national cricket team.

Intercontinental Cup

Intercontinental Cup One-Day

1st match

2nd match

References

External links
 

2011 in Afghan cricket
2011 in Emirati sport
UAE
International cricket competitions in 2011–12